The Municipal Stadium in Skalica, Slovakia, is a football stadium that serves as the home ground of MFK Skalica and has capacity of 1,500. The stadium is also equipped with a 6-lane running track. In 2014 two covered sections were constructed on both sides of the main grandstand, and the stadium now has a seating capacity of 800.

See also
List of football stadiums in Slovakia

References 

Football venues in Slovakia